WARU-FM (101.9 FM) is a radio station licensed to Roann, Indiana, United States, broadcasting a Progressive Rock format. The station is owned and operated by Dream Weaver Marketing, LLC and features programming from the MiBash Sports Radio Network and Westwood One. Both frequencies are operated through the same facility in Peru, Indiana.

History
On July 17, 1998, the station went on the air as WBFK. On July 13, 1999, the station changed its call sign to WMYK. On August 12, 2001, the station changed to WARU-FM on the current frequency 101.9 MHz.  Since 2001, the station has undergone several changes to its format, such as Classic Rock, All 80's Adult Contemporary, Country, and Adult Hits. As of January 3, 2015, the station began featuring the music of legendary rock bands and artists along with many of their album/s' deeper cuts under the branding '101.9 Rocks'. The station added syndicated Pink Floyd program "Floydian Slip" in January 2022.

Technical
Transmitter is a 5000 watt Broadcast Electronics FM-5T utilizing a single high power forced-air cooled metal/ceramic tetrode vacuum tube (type number 4CX3500A) in a high efficiency half wave cavity as the RF final amplifier stage.  This tetrode requires approximately 100 watts of RF drive power which is generated by an all solid state BE FM250C exciter (direct FM).  The audio path was upgraded in 2020 with an emphasis on fidelity vs. compression.

References

External links

Radio stations established in 2001
ARU-FM